Xabier 'Xabi' Castillo Aranburu (born 29 March 1986) is a Spanish former professional footballer who played as a left-back.

Club career
Born in Durango, Biscay, Castillo came up through the ranks at Athletic Bilbao, but made his senior debut with Basque neighbours Real Sociedad, where he had finished his football development. His first professional experience came with UD Las Palmas on loan, in 2006–07's Segunda División. In his first two seasons with Real Sociedad's first team he was first choice, in the same level.

On 15 July 2009, Castillo returned his first alma mater and signed a four-year deal. He made his La Liga debut in the campaign opener (30 August 2009), a 1–0 home win against RCD Espanyol, and made a total of 45 competitive appearances in his first two years.

Castillo spent the entire 2011–12 on the sidelines, due to a patellar ligament injury. Upon returning he was only a fringe player, being released by the Marcelo Bielsa-led squad in June 2013 after his contract expired and returning to former club Las Palmas.

On 10 July 2014, Castillo joined Deportivo Alavés also of the second tier.

References

External links

1986 births
Living people
People from Durango, Biscay
Sportspeople from Biscay
Spanish footballers
Footballers from the Basque Country (autonomous community)
Association football defenders
La Liga players
Segunda División players
Segunda División B players
Real Sociedad B footballers
Real Sociedad footballers
UD Las Palmas players
Athletic Bilbao footballers
Deportivo Alavés players
Spain youth international footballers
Basque Country international footballers